Vijalapur Seshadri Vijay Kumar, usually known as V. S. Vijay Kumar, (born 28 April 1944 - died 31 May 2019)  was an Indian cricketer who played for Karnataka. In his nine year career as a right-handed opening batsman, he appeared in 57 first class matches and scored nearly 3000 runs.

References

External links
 
 Cricketarchive profile
 Times of India obituary (accessed 7 February 2021)

1946 births
2019 deaths
Karnataka cricketers
Indian cricketers
Cricketers from Bangalore